Shin Seung-Kyung  (born September 7, 1981) is a South Korean football player. He has played for Gyeongnam FC and Gimhae City FC.

References

1981 births
Living people
South Korean footballers
K League 1 players
Korea National League players
Association football goalkeepers
Gimhae FC players